The flag of Basilicata is one of the official symbols of the region of Basilicata, Italy. The current flag was adopted on 6 April 1999.

Symbolism
The flag is the coat of arms of Basilicata superimposed on the a field of azure. An unofficial variant has "Regione Basilicata" above the coat of arms, a gold-bordered white shield with four blue waves, representing the four major rivers of the region: the Basento, Agri, Bradano and Sinni.

References

Basilicata
Basilicata
Basilicata